Cockburn Central station is a bus and railway station on the Transperth network. It is located at the juncture of the Mandurah andonce completed Thornlie lines,  from Perth station inside the median strip of the Kwinana Freeway serving the suburb of Cockburn Central.

History
During planning, the station was known as Thomsons Lake station.

Cockburn Central railway station was designed to subsume the nearby Success Park 'n' Ride bus station. The Park 'n' Ride was decommissioned after the railway station opened.

The contract for the construction of Cockburn Central railway station, Kwinana railway station and Wellard railway station was awarded to the consortium of DORIC Constructions and Brierty Contractors in March 2005. This contract was labelled "package B", and had a cost of $32 million. Construction on the station began in mid-2005.

Cockburn Central station opened along with the rest of the Mandurah line on 23 December 2007. When the station opened, Cockburn Central became a suburb in its own right. Two linked turnback sidings lie to the south of the station, which are used by terminating services from Perth. A pair of crossovers were previously situated between the mainline tracks to the north of the station, but were removed during the 2021-2022 Thornlie-Cockburn Link realignment works.

Future
Cockburn Central will be the terminus of the Thornlie railway line when it is extended to Cockburn. The previous opening date for the link was 2023, but at the 2021–22 State Budget, it was announced that the Thornlie–Cockburn link had been deferred by 12 months, as a result of Western Australia's skills shortage. This was alongside the deferment of 15 other state government infrastructure projects.

As part of a major realignment of railway tracks at the station, the Mandurah line was closed between Elizabeth Quay and Aubin Grove from 26 December 2021 to 14 January 2022. In this time, the existing Mandurah line tracks were moved to the edge of the rail corridor to make room for the new Thornlie line tracks that will take its place at the location.

Services

Cockburn Central station is served by the Mandurah line, Transperth busses, and will also be served by the Thornlie line when it is completed.

Cockburn Central station saw 1,575,735 passengers in the 2013–14 financial year.

Platforms

Bus routes

Stands 1–6

Stands 7–12

Public artwork

"Face of the Community"
Two billboard-sized artworks, titled "Face of the Community", were installed on the north and south faces of a tower at the station in 2006. The $40,000 artwork was created by artists Rodney Glick and Marco Marcon and featured the images of a young boy and a middle-aged woman who are not real people but a composite generated from over 250 photos of residents from the Cockburn area. Throughout the years the artworks (which were clearly visible from the Kwinana Freeway) received polarising opinions from the community, with some mistakenly believing the images to be that of missing persons, while Member for Cockburn Fran Logan called the artwork "weird, confusing and frankly a little creepy". The Public Transport Authority considered removing the artworks in 2015 after a rise in social media comments but following consultation with the council and a public survey, the artwork was retained. However the condition of the artworks deteriorated over time and in October 2019, the two images were removed due to safety concerns.

"Carnaby's Black Cockatoo"

In December 2019, the state government launched an online survey with members of the public asked to select what should replace the Face of the Community images from four choices: a new artwork, an analogue clock, digital advertising or restoring the original artworks. Only 8% of responses voted for the return of Face of the Community, with 43% opting for a new piece of artwork. A shortlist of three new artworks created by artists Penny Bovell and John Toohey, Kerise Delcoure, and Signs & Lines were revealed in December 2020, and an online survey was conducted to choose the new artwork. In January 2021, Delcoure's pieces, which features a portrayal of Carnaby's black cockatoos amongst salmon gums and banksia trees, was voted the most preferred artwork of the three shortlisted. It was installed on the north and south faces of the tower in August that year.

"Places of the Community" 
On 23 June 2015, artwork by Perth artist Lyn Merrington was installed on the western face of the station's tower. Titled "Places of the Community", the $30,000 artwork featured painted images of the 10 most-loved locations in Cockburn and landmarks visited most often by local residents, as determined by an online survey. The original paintings were donated to local organisations.

References

External links

Station map New MetroRail

Mandurah line
Railway stations in Perth, Western Australia
Railway stations in Australia opened in 2007
Transperth railway stations in highway medians
Bus stations in Perth, Western Australia